Balidhidin is a district in the northeastern Bari region of Somalia.

Districts of Somalia
Bari, Somalia